Kiesewetter is a German surname. Notable people with the surname include:

Knut Kiesewetter (1941–2016), German jazz musician, singer, songwriter and producer
Peter Kiesewetter (1945–2012), German modern classical composer
Roderich Kiesewetter (born 1963), German politician
André Kiesewetter (born 1969), German ski jumper
Michéle Kiesewetter (1984–2007), German police officer killed by Neo-nazi terrorists
Craig Kieswetter (born 1987), England cricketer
Jerome Kiesewetter (born 1993), German-American soccer player

See also
Kiesewetter Stradivarius (c. 1723), antique violin fabricated by Italian luthier Antonio Stradivari of Cremona

German-language surnames
Surnames from nicknames